Park View School is a mixed secondary school located in the West Green area in the London Borough of Haringey, England.

It is a community school administered by Haringey London Borough Council. The catchment area of Park View encompasses one of the most ethnically, culturally and socially diverse areas in the UK and over 74% of pupils at the school speak English as an additional language. Park View emphasises its "broad and balanced" curriculum, placing equal importance on the arts, alongside academic rigour and success.

Park View has been rated as good by Ofsted since 2013 and this was reaffirmed through a section 8 short inspection in November 2017. Park View is regarded as a national leader in addressing child mental health issues and in 2015 was awarded the prestigious HSJ award for its work in this area.

References

External links
 Park View official website

Secondary schools in the London Borough of Haringey
Community schools in the London Borough of Haringey